"Have It All" is a song by American singer-songwriter Jason Mraz. It was released on April 27, 2018, on Atlantic Records as the lead single from his sixth studio album, Know.

Background
Mraz said: "‘Have It All’ stood out as a song with a hopeful message to help me heal and move forward; a song with a message of generosity—the antithesis of despondency," "It’s a blessing disguised as a rap song, and it’s meant to be paid forward and shared.”

The song speaks of life’s limitless possibilities of hope, togetherness, affection, friendship, intimacy, and beyond. And lyrics convey a dream for another, a hopeful dream to not just know about life but live life to the fullest.

Music video
The accompanying music video was shot in Mraz's hometown of Richmond, Virginia. It begins with Mraz waking up and stepping onto a balcony as a cheerful radio announcer speaking of a "beautiful day" and encouraging listeners to "Get out there and say 'hi' to [their] neighbor." There are then various clips of Mraz dancing down the street, riding a Segway scooter with a group of tourists and playing with a group of musicians in a trolley car. Mraz then arrives at a middle school and leads a Flash Mob of students into an assembly. The video continues with everyone dancing in the school yard and gymnasium, and concludes with a clip of Mraz and a young girl singing an acoustic version of the song.

Charts

Weekly charts

Year-end charts

Certifications

References

2018 singles
2018 songs
Atlantic Records singles
Jason Mraz songs
Songs written by Jason Mraz
Songs written by Jacob Kasher
Songs written by David Hodges